This is a list of airports in Botswana, sorted by location.

Note: Only airports with an ICAO airport code and/or IATA airport code have been included. Airport names shown in bold indicate the airport has scheduled service on commercial airlines.



Airports

See also 
 
 Transport in Botswana
 List of airports by ICAO code: F#FB - Botswana
 Wikipedia: WikiProject Aviation/Airline destination lists: Africa#Botswana

References 
 
  - includes IATA codes
 Great Circle Mapper: Airports in Botswana
 World Aero Data: Airports in Botswana
 Airport records for Botswana at Landings.com. Retrieved 2013-08-21

Botswana
 
Airports
Airports
Botswana